Joe Inglis (born ) is a veterinary surgeon in the United Kingdom. He is best known for his appearances on television advising viewers on pet issues. Inglis is the author of several books, the first, It Really Does Happen to a Vet!, is a diary of his first year in veterinary practice.

Career
While studying to be a vet at Bristol University, Inglis was filmed for the British reality TV show Vet School. He qualified as a vet in 1996, and went on to appear for seven years in Vets in Practice, the follow-up to Vet School, as well as a catch-up series in 2008 called Return to... Vets in Practice. Inglis was the resident vet on Blue Peter for four years, appeared on BBC One's The One Show, held pet clinics on Channel 5's The Wright Stuff, and appeared on ITV's breakfast show, Daybreak.

In 2005, Inglis launched the dog food range Joe & Jack's Natural Dinners, which was sold in the UK by Tesco from 2008, and in 2010, he launched a pet food brand, Vet's Kitchen.

Inglis was the CEO of a Vet's Klinik, a veterinary practice in Swindon, which opened in 2012.

In 2013, Inglis was one of several co-founders of tails.com, a company which produces bespoke pet foods for dogs. That year, he collaborated with chef Simon Rimmer to create a series of fancy meals for cats, in order to raise money for the RSPCA.

Personal life
Inglis resides in the Cotswolds with his second wife, Jenny Smith, and their three children. Inglis met Smith when both were working on Blue Peter. Inglis was previously married to Emma Milne.

Away from his veterinary work, Inglis is a sculptor; his work was first exhibited in 2016.

Bibliography

References

Year of birth missing (living people)
Alumni of the University of Bristol
Living people
British veterinarians
People from Bibury